Bruce Bastin (born 19 September 1939) is an English folklorist and a leading expert on the blues styles of the southeastern states of America, (East Coast Blues and Piedmont Blues). In 2022, his publication Red River Blues: The Blues Tradition in the Southeast was inducted into the Blues Hall of Fame, as a 'Classic of Blues Literature'.

He is responsible for much ground-breaking research (much done initially with folklorist Peter B. Lowry) over the decades.

Bastin was born in Chelmsford, Essex, England. A former secondary school geography teacher, he holds a master's degree in Folklore from the University of North Carolina at Chapel Hill and is the author of two books on the Piedmont blues, Crying for the Carolines and  Red River Blues: The Blues Tradition in the Southeast, as well as a biography of music publisher Joe Davis, Never Sell a Copyright. He has written articles for many music journals and books over the decades, plus liner note essays on the South Eastern blues style.

Bruce Bastin is also the managing director of Interstate Music, Ltd., West Sussex, England, with its labels: 
 Country Routes
 Flyright
 Harlequin
 Heritage
 Krazy Kat
 Magpie
 Travelin' Man

He has produced and/or programmed albums for them in many musical genres, generally re-issue in nature.

Publications
Bastin, Bruce (1971) Crying for the Carolines (London: Studio Vista). .
Bastin, Bruce (1986/1995) Red River Blues: The Blues Tradition in the Southeast (Urbana and Chicago: University of Illinois Press). , 
Bastin, Bruce "Blind Boy Fuller" in Grossman, Stefan & Fuller, Blind Boy Stefan Grossman's early masters of American blues guitar: Blind Boy Fuller, Alfred Music Publishing, 1993 , 
Bastin, Bruce "Truckin' My Blues Away - East Coast Piedmont Styles" in Lawrence Cohn, ed. (1993). Nothing But the Blues: The Music and the Musicians. Abbeville Publishing Group (Abbeville Press, Inc.), pp. 205 – 231. .

References

External links
 Flyright Records at Interstate Music Ltd.
 Illustrated Flyright Records discography
 Illustrated Krazy Kat Records discography
 Illustrated Magpie Records discography
 Illustrated Travelin' Man Records discography

1939 births
People from Chelmsford
Living people
American musicologists
English folklorists